Qais Ahmad Kamawal (born 15 August 2000) is an Afghan cricketer. He made his Test match debut for the Afghanistan cricket team in September 2019.

Domestic career
Qais Ahmad made his senior cricket debut for Kabul Eagles in the 2017 Shpageeza Cricket League in September 2017, before going on to make his first-class cricket debut for Speen Ghar Region in the 2018 Ahmad Shah Abdali 4-day Tournament in March the following year. He took ten wickets in the game and was named the player of the match, going on to be the leading wicket-taker for Speen Ghar Region during the tournament, with 41 dismissals in eight matches. His List A debut followed in July 2018 for Speen Ghar Region in the 2018 Ghazi Amanullah Khan Regional One Day Tournament.

In May 2021, he signed to play for Kent County Cricket Club in the 2021 T20 Blast. In December 2021, he re-signed for Kent for the county's 2022 T20 Blast campaign.

T20 franchise career
Ahead of the 2018 Caribbean Premier League, during which he played for St Lucia Stars, Qais was named as one of five players to watch in the tournament. In September 2018, he was named in Balkh Legends squad in the first edition of the Afghanistan Premier League tournament. In the final of the tournament, he took a five-wicket haul, and was named the player of the match, with Balkh winning the title. He was also the leading wicket-taker for the team in the tournament, with 15 dismissals in nine matches.

He played in the 2018–19 Bangladesh Premier League for Rajshahi Kings, and in February 2019 was signed by the Hobart Hurricanes for the remainder of the 2018–19 Big Bash League season, as a replacement for the injured Tymal Mills. He also appeared for the side in the following season's competition before playing for Guyana Amazon Warriors in the 2020 Caribbean Premier League. In October 2020, he was drafted by the Colombo Kings for the inaugural edition of the Lanka Premier League.

International career
In December 2017, he was named in Afghanistan's squad for the 2018 Under-19 Cricket World Cup, going on to be the side's leading wicket-taker in the tournament, with 14 wickets. Following Afghanistan's matches in the tournament, the International Cricket Council (ICC) named Ahmad as the rising star of the squad. In December 2018, he was named in Afghanistan's under-23 team for the 2018 ACC Emerging Teams Asia Cup, before being named in the Test squad for their one-off match against Bangladesh. He made his Test debut in the match in September 2019.

In February 2020, Qais was named in Afghanistan's Twenty20 International (T20I) squad for their series against Ireland. He made his T20I debut during the series, playing in the final match on 10 March 2020.

In July 2021, he was named as one of four reserve players in Afghanistan's One Day International (ODI) squad for their series against Pakistan. In September 2021, he was named in Afghanistan's squad for the 2021 ICC Men's T20 World Cup. In January 2022, he was named in Afghanistan's ODI squad for their series against the Netherlands in Qatar. He made his ODI debut on 25 January 2022, for Afghanistan against the Netherlands.

References

External links
 

2000 births
Living people
Afghan cricketers
Afghanistan Test cricketers
Afghanistan One Day International cricketers
Afghanistan Twenty20 International cricketers
Saint Lucia Kings cricketers
Hobart Hurricanes cricketers
Balkh Legends cricketers
Spin Ghar Tigers cricketers
Multan Sultans cricketers
Rajshahi Royals cricketers
Colombo Stars cricketers
Quetta Gladiators cricketers
Welsh Fire cricketers
Kent cricketers
Melbourne Stars cricketers